Olaiya may refer to:

People 
Moji Olaiya (1975–2017), Nigerian actress
Moses Olaiya (1936–2018), Nigerian dramatist, comedian and actor
Victor Olaiya (1930–2020), Nigerian trumpeter

Other uses
Olaiya House, a Brazilian-style building on Lagos Island, Nigeria

See also
 Olaya (disambiguation)